This article is a list of regional yellow pages, a telephone directory of businesses.

A 
 Afghanistan: In Afghanistan, the Canadian INGO Peace Dividend Trust launched a free online directory with over 2700 verified and registered Afghan enterprises in late 2006.
 Albania: In Albania, the directory is called Flete te Verdha – Albanian Yellow Pages which is a registered trademark belonging to and Fleteteverdha sh.p.k, GjejBiznese.com from Tirana.
 Algeria: In Algeria, the Yellow Pages business directory is published in French as Les Pages Maghreb. It is also available online in French.
 Anguilla: In Anguilla, the directory is published by Global Directories Limited and titled Anguilla Yellow Pages. Print copies are distributed free to each telephone subscriber and is also available online.
 Armenia: In Armenia, "Spyur" Information Center introduces "Armenia Yellow Pages". Directory is printed in English, Armenian and Russian(17500 copies a year). Other directory Armenian Business Pages was launched in 2015 by Comfy LLC and represents only digital version of yellow pages of Armenia.
 Aruba: In Aruba, the official telephone directory of Setar is published by Global Directories Limited and titled Aruba Yellow Pages. 85.000 Print copies are distributed free to households and companies and is also available online
 Austria: The "Yellow Pages" and IYP services are provided by: HEROLD Business Data GmbH, a European Directories group company.
 Australia: In Australia, the most comprehensive business directory is the Yellow Pages published by Sensis. The directory is also available online, on mobile and via smartphone app.

B 
 Bangladesh: In Bangladesh, the business directory is published by Ad Yellowpages Pages and titled Ad Yellowpages Yellow Pages. AdYP, a sister concern of Ad Yellowpages.com is a new concept brought forward by the founders of the site. The site provide a variety of information about local places and businesses in Bangladesh.
 Bahrain: In Bahrain, the business directory is published by Primedia International BSC (c) and titled Bahrain Yellow Pages. Primedia International signifies a fundamental move away from the traditional business directories to new print & online media.
 Barbados: In Barbados, the directory is published by Global Directories Limited and titled Barbados Yellow Pages. Print copies are distributed free to each telephone subscriber and is also available online.
 Belarus: In Belarus, the directory is titled Business-Belarus (Russian), it is also available online. There is an alternative directory, called Belarus XXI vek (Belarus 21st century), which is analogue to Yellow Pages; it is also available online.
 Belgium: In Belgium, the directory is titled Pages d'Or (golden pages) (French) or Gouden Gids (golden guide) (Dutch), and is distributed free to each telephone subscriber, it is also available online.
 Bonaire: In Bonaire, the directory is published by Global Directories Limited and titled Bonaire Yellow Pages. Print copies are distributed free to each telephone subscriber.
 Bolivia: In Bolivia, yellowpages exist online under the URL Yellow Pages.com.bo.
 Bosnia: In Bosnia, Yellow Pages exist online under YellowPages.ba.
 Brazil: In Brazil, the directory is titled Páginas Amarelas and is distributed free to each telephone subscriber. Available online by DYK Internet S/A.
 British Virgin Islands: In the British Virgin Islands, the directory is published by Global Directories Limited and titled British Virgin Islands Yellow Pages. Print copies are distributed free to each telephone subscriber and is also available online.

C 
 Cambodia: In Cambodia, the official Yellow Pages directory is called Cambodia Yellow Pages and published under contract to local Ministry of Posts and Telecommunications by CAMYP Co., Ltd.
 Canada: In Canada, the company Yellow Pages Group owns the trademarks Yellow Pages and Pages Jaunes. It produces and distributes directories in both English and French. Yellow Pages Group is the market leader in print and online commercial directories and one of the largest media companies in Canada, producing the official directories of Bell Canada, Bell Aliant, Bell MTS, Telus, and others. Saskatchewan's SaskTel, through subsidiary DirectWest, is believed to be the last major incumbent local exchange carrier to publish its own directories. Competitive local directory publishers, such as PhoneGuide or DirectWest's operations in Manitoba and Alberta, usually include commercial directories on yellow paper.
 Cayman Islands: In the Cayman Islands, the directory is published by Global Directories Limited and titled Cayman Islands Yellow Pages. Print copies are distributed free to each telephone subscriber and is also available online and on mobile devices.
 Chile:
 China: In China, the modern yellow pages industry was started in the late 1990s with the formation of two international joint ventures between US yellow pages publishers and China's telecom operators, namely: a joint venture started in Shenzhen between RHDonnelley and China Unicom (later including Hong Kong's PCCW and InfoSpace); and a joint venture between China Telecom Shanghai and what later came to be known as the yellow pages operations of Verizon . Later, another mainly state-owned telecom operator, China Netcom began to produce, either directly or on a sub-contracted basis, yellow pages in selected cities around the country. By early 2005, there were a number of independent local and international yellow pages operators in numerous cities including Yilong Huangbaoshu, based in Hangzhou, Zhejiang Province with operations in Hangzhou and Ningbo . However, there is no nationwide Yellow pages in any format and only some international-trade related businesses including INBIT (USA), CHINAPAGES.COM and ALIBABA.COM (Chinese) are running some kind of national online databases based on business lists not from telephone companies. China Yellow Pages is also a common-place for finding manufacturers and exporters from China.
 Colombia: In Colombia, the standard yellow and White Pages are published and distributed every year free of charge by Publicar, a Colombian subsidiary company of Carvajal, which also publishes and distributes yellow and white pages in other Latin American countries.
 Croatia: In Croatia, the directory is called Žute stranice (yellow pages), published by MTI Telefonski imenik/Zute stranice. Another directory is CroPages Business Directory/Poslovni Adresar, published by Masmedia.
 Cuba: In Cuba, the equivalent online directory is titled Paginas Amarillas, with information on the whole of Cuba.
 Cyprus: In Cyprus, the Yellow Pages is edited by ID Yellowpages Ltd Cyprus Yellow Pages Directory.
 Cyprus (North); In Turkish Republic of Northern Cyprus CYPYP North Cyprus Yellow Pages
 Czech Republic: In the Czech Republic and Slovakia, the directory is titled Zlaté stránky (golden pages), published by Mediatel, Prague (a European Directories group company) and is distributed free to each telephone subscriber, usually in exchange for its previous version.

D 
 Denmark: In Denmark, a full online directory including most phone numbers is provided by De Gule Sider (a brand of Eniro, a Nordic search engine and directories company), with paper versions of yellow and white pages distributed to subscribers throughout the country; it was formerly a part of TDC Forlag, a subsidiary of the national telecoms operator.
 Dominica: In Dominica, the directory is published by Global Directories Limited and titled Dominica Yellow Pages. Print copies are distributed free to each telephone subscriber and is also available online at www.dominicayp.com.
 Dominican Republic: In Dominican Republic, published by Caribe Media. Publishing of printed and / or digital directories in the Dominican Republic.

E 
 Egypt: Egypt Yellow Pages Ltd is the official publisher of Yellow Pages branded products in Egypt. Egypt Yellow Pages Ltd, founded in 1991, is the owner of the Yellow Pages trademark in Egypt.
 Europe: For whole Europe, the European Yellow Pages apply. The European Yellow Pages is an effort of providing harmonized data to different language environments through keeping the character of having localized search capabilities on a regional level. Harmonizing data in this context means providing information to global users mainly in English and to local users in their native language.
 Europe: For Europe the directory Yellobook.eu is providing information about many branches and companies all around 33 major European countries.

F 
 Finland: In Finland, the directories are called Keltaiset sivut, Fonecta.fi, Finder.fi and Eniro.fi
 France: In France, Yellow Pages are referred to as Pages Jaunes. They are distributed free by Pagesjaunes.fr, a company affiliated with France Télécom. Pagesjaunes.com, the .com version of Pages Jaunes, was the issue of a major court case at WIPO; the original registrant, an individual from Los Angeles, won against France Télécom. This court decision defended by the Parisian Lawyer, Andre Bertrand, was path-setting for the whole European Yellow Pages industry, as it decided that the phrase "Yellow Pages" cannot be considered the property of a single company. Previously, many former state monopoly telecom companies outside the US had tried to ban competition by claiming the term "yellow pages", or the translation of "yellow pages" into the vernacular, as their exclusive trademark. Vivendi Universal moved to enter the French Yellow Pages market in 2001 with scoot.fr, but the attempt was a killed by a reorganisation of the struggling company. Another French editor of Yellow Pages is le Bottin. More competition is expected in November 2005 from the liberalisation of "12", the former unique "4-1-1" number of Renseignements Telephoniques, French for Directory Inquiry. In November 2006 France Télécom sold its majority share in pagesjaunes.fr to Mediannuaire. In August 2007 pagesjaunes.com finally became active, giving France two different Pages Jaunes; thus creating agitation at pagesjaunes.fr, which reshaped their site and started a massive advertisement campaign all over France.

G 
 Georgia: In Georgia, the directory is called ყვითელი ფურცლები and published by "Yellow Pages Tbilisi" Ltd.
 Germany: In Germany, a directory titled Die Gelben Seiten is distributed free to each subscriber, by the Deutsche Telekom, owner of T-Mobile. Other Yellow pages are edited by Go Yellow.de, Klicktel.de and Gelbex.de. In 2006 a lawsuit with the Deutsches Patentamt denied the validity of the German Trademark "Gelbe Seiten" which in fact is the German translation of the universal expression "Yellow Pages". Klaus Harisch, an Internet Pioneer from Munich and founder of Go Yellow.de had spent over 7 Million Euros on Lawyer Fees to fight for the cancellation of the German "Gelbe Seiten" trademark. Deutsche Telekom had also registered "Yellow Pages" as a German trademark which they lost at the same time. On a European Level Deutsche Telekom had failed to register "Gelbe Seiten Deutschland" or "Yellow Pages Germany" as a Euro Trademark with OMPI.
 Gibraltar: A combined White and Yellow Pages directory, along with an IYP service, are provided by: gibyellow.gi, a European Directories group company.
 Ghana: Ghana Business Directory Ghana's Largest Business Directory, launched in March 2009. It has review system which helps to know the reputation of the local business.
 Greece: In Greece, Yellow Pages are called "Chrysos Odigos" that can be translated as "The Golden Guide".
 Grenada: In Grenada, the directory is published by Global Directories Limited and titled Grenada Yellow Pages. Print copies are distributed free to each telephone subscriber and is also available online at www.grenadayp.com.
 Guyana: In Guyana, the directory service is provided by "GT&T" in printed format and in online services, there are quite a few, some of them are "YellowPagesGuyana", "YellowGuyana" and "GT&T's" own online yellowpages directory--"yellowpages.com.gy".

H 
 Hong Kong: In Hong Kong, the phone directory was titled Hong Kong Yellow Pages, published by PCCW Media Limited.
 Hungary: In Hungary, the directory is called Arany Oldalak (gold pages); are published and distributed by MTT Magyar Telefonkönyvkiadó Kft, Budaörs.

I 
 India: India is a very large country in terms of population, business activities and economy. There are multiple Yellow Pages being published by private sector companies. Some of them focus the whole nation and some are regional.
 Indonesia: In Indonesia, the telecommunication company Telkom with PT. Infomedia Nusantara (one of its subsidiaries), regularly publishes phone books. The company provides directory, call centre, and content services since 1984. The phone books consist of white pages and yellow pages, which are published in hard and soft copies.
 Iran: In the Islamic Republic of Iran, the directory is called The first book or in Persian Keta:b e Avval. This directory divides into different sections such as Directory of Businesses, jobs and maps and city guides. There is an official YellowPages in Iran owned and published by Iranian Yellow Page company. It has been developed in Persian and English languages, and contains different categories and locations of Iran. There is also an unofficial company that runs The Iran Yellow Pages. This directory is published by Moballeghan Publishing and Advertising Company (1986) with the cooperation of The Trade Promotion Organization of Iran. By 2010 a new updated comprehensive directory called "The First Portal", or "First Eurasia E-commerce" or in Persian "تجارت الكترونيك اول" comes to the Iran high potential markets.
 Iraq: In Iraq, the directory is called Yellow Pages or in Arabic (Al Safahat al Safraa). This directory divides into different sections such as directory of businesses, jobs and maps and city guides and contains thousands of businesses in many categories. The directory is published by Alam Al-Rooya Publishing and Advertising Company.
 Ireland: In the Republic of Ireland, the directory is called Golden Pages and is published by FCR Media. Ireland's free Yellow pages is called BusinessPages.i.e.
 Israel: In Israel, the yellow pages Hebrew edition is called Dapei Zahav (Golden Pages) and the English edition is Golden Pages. The print directories come out in separate issues based on Israel's different telephone area codes, published by Golden Pages Publications Ltd. Five million copies of the yellow pages are distributed annually. The Israeli telecommunication company Bezeq runs a competing service called B144.
 Italy: in Italy, the directory is titled Pagine Gialle (Yellow Pages). The printed versions come out in separate issues for province as White pages. Some years ago, an alternative directory, called Pagine utili (Useful Page) was proposed.

K 
 Kazakhstan: In Kazakhstan, the directory is Yellow Pages of Kazakhstan, published by Yellow Pages Kazakhstan Management Group.
 South Korea: In South Korea, the directory is published and distributed by many publishers:
 BiG Yellow Pages. Korean National Directory, by Yellow Pages Korea;
 Korea Yellow Pages, by Korea Yellow Pages;
 Korea English Yellow Pages, by Korea Telecom Directory.
 Kosovo: In Kosovo, Faqe te Verdha the directory is called Flete te Verdha – Yellow Pages Kosovo which is a registered trademark belonging to New Born Media (newborn.media) and Yellow Pages Kosovo sh.p.k from Prishtina.
 Kyrgyzstan: In Kyrgyzstan, Yellowpages can be found under the URL "yellowpages.kg".

L 
 Lebanon: In Lebanon, the Yellow Pages business directory is published in Arabic and French by PAGESJAUNES LIBAN.

M 
 Macau: In Macau, the phone directory is titled Macau Yellow Pages/Páginas Amarelas, publ. by Directel Macau Listas Telefonicas Lda.
 Madagascar: In Madagascar yellow pages can be found via the site Madagascar Yellow Pages.
 Malaysia: In Malaysia, there are 4 large directories Malaysia Yellow Pages, Malaysia Super Pages, Malaysia Business Directory and BCZ.com
 Maldives: In Maldives, the commercial phone directory is called Yell.
 Mali: In Mali, the equivalent online directory is titled Malipages.com.
 Malta: In Malta, the Yellow Pages Directory is published by Ark Publishing Group. It has been publishing the Yellow Pages since 1997 and each year distributes 200,000 directories free of charge to the general public.
 Mauritius: In Mauritius, the Yellow Pages Directory is published by Teleservices Ltd and is known as MT yellow pages
 Mexico: In Mexico, there are several commercial phone directories. The incumbent is called Seccion Amarilla.com.mx (Yellow Section) is published by Anuncios en Directorios, S.A. de C.V., a subsidiary of Telmex, the local Telco. Others are Paginas Amarillas.com.mx (Yellow Pages) published by Phonebook of the World, Paginas Amarillas.com published by Publicar, Mexico Data Online.com published by the Mexico Business Directory and Paginas Utiles.com.mx published by Ideas Intercativas, S.A.
 Moldova: In Moldova yellow pages can be found via the site www.yp.md.
 Mongolia: In Mongolia, the directory is called Mongolia Yellow Pages (yellow pages) and can be found via www.yp.mn.
 Montserrat: In Montserrat, the directory is published by Global Directories Limited and titled Montserrat Yellow Pages. Print copies are distributed free to each telephone subscriber and is also available online.
 Morocco: In Morocco, the directory is called Pages Jaunes (yellow pages).
 Myanmar: In Myanmar, the directory is called Myanmar Yellow Pages (မြန်မာအဝါရောင်စီးပွားရေးလမ်းညွှန်).

N 
 Netherlands: In Netherlands, the directory is called Gouden Gids (literally "Golden Guide"), and within the district concerned, it was until 2018 distributed free to each telephone subscriber, by Youvia Holding BV (a European Directories group company). From 2019 onwards the "Gouden Gids" is an online only service.
 New Zealand: In New Zealand, the yellow.co.nz directory is printed in 18 regional editions by Yellow Pages Group (YPG). YPG also publishes 18 regional editions of 'White Pages' (combined government, residential and business listings), and a 'Local Directory' for some urban areas and sub-regions.
 Nigeria: In Nigeria, Yellow Pages companies are privately owned. NigerianYellowPages.com is the official trademark owner of the walking finger logo with six (6) edition of its yellow pages in different formats. YellowPages.net.ng claimed to be the first Yellow Pages Directory in the world to emulate social media network concept.
 Nigerian Yellow Pages: Content of Nigerian Yellow Pages or commonly known as NigerianYellowPages.com is available in six formats (editions): CD-ROM directory; MS Windows Desktop directory; Internet directory; Mobile Phone Internet directory  Mobile Phone SMS text directory and Print directory. There is also a mobile edition, which is accessible on mobile phones and other mobile devices such as PDA. There is a dedicated classifieds section in their yellow pages for jobs, properties, homes, rentals and announcements. It has its own toolbar, the Nigerian Yellow Pages Toolbar. Another competitor is Nigeria Business Directory is an online business directory in Nigeria to locate addresses, phone numbers, maps, websites, photos, services of business places and offices in Nigeria.
 Africaonline business directory: The other Yellowpage business directory in Nigeria is the Africaonline business directory, yellopages.com. This is an interactive online business directory that enables businesses to upload their profiles and place their adverts. Yellopages.com includes Nigerian content and serves to integrate Nigerian businesses.
 Norway: In Norway, the directory is called Gule Sider (Yellow Pages). The two second largest directories are Opplysningen 1881 and Nettkatalogen. Gul.no, 180.no, Avanti Media AS, Bedriftssøket AS, Gul Index and Finnfirma.no are som of the other directories in growth. The searchengine Sesam.no provides a business directory branded Sesam Katalog.

P 
 Pakistan:
Jamal's Yellow Pages of Pakistan: is a B2B Trade Directory published by US Publishers (Pvt) Ltd. since 1983. The directory is published in printed form (3 volumes per set), CDROM version and online.
Pakistan Yellow Pages: is a web-based B2B Business Directory established in 2009, also known as YPP. The directory provides a dashboard for lead management, customer management, customer reviews and listing performance features. The YPP is a project by Yellow Pages Pakistan. 
Time's Trade Directory of Pakistan: Time Publishers (Pvt) Ltd. published "Time's Trade Directory of Pakistan – National Yellow Pages" since 2002. B2B Version also launch similarly as Time's e-Directory. The online version also provide comprehensive information about Pakistan Businesses to the web user worldwide.
Dmoz Pakistan: Database of Pakistani companies, Government departments and business organizations in categorized format.
yellowpagespk.com: Marshall Online Yellow Pages in Islamabad Pakistan & Online Business Directory in Islamabad Rawalpindi Lahore Karachi Pakistan.
Ypages.pk: Online Business Directory 
TheOnlinePoint.com: Web of Social & Business Directory maintains yellow pages and social directory by ORM Group. Which is updated listings of companies and products and services all around the Pakistan. 
 Palestine: Palestine Yellow Pages Ltd is the official publisher of Yellow Pages branded products in Palestine. Palestine Yellow Pages is the exclusive owner of the Yellow Pages, Walking Fingers & Design, and YellowPages.com.ps trademarks in Palestine. Palestine Yellow Pages is part of the Al Wahda-Express Group of Companies. Founded in 1986, Al Wahda-Express Group of Companies publishes print, online and mobile Yellow Pages directories throughout 5 countries including Palestine.
 Panama: In Panama, Yellow Pages Panama
 Peru: In United States, Peruvian Yellow Pages, since 1993, the printed edition, is the first and oldest publication for Peruvians living in the USA. Now with the online version covering coast to coast the American territory. The online version of the Peruvian yellow pages is available at Peruvian Yellow Pages.
 Philippines: In the Philippines, Directories Philippines Corporation (DPC), regularly publishes phone books of more than a dozen telecom companies in the country.
 Poland: In Poland, it is called żółte strony and is distributed by Polskie Książki Telefoniczne (a European Directories group company) as a part of their phone books. The second largest directory, published by Eniro, is called "Panorama Firm" (panorama of companies). YellowPages.pl. It is the biggest online directory in Poland. Polish Yellow Pages has existed on the market since 1998. Yellow Pages enables them to search companies and products and services, it is a business platform, which helps to promote a company and to establish trade relations. In April 2007 started zumi.pl – first local search web which connects maps and information about companies in Poland. Several historical directories from Poland are available online as scans, and can be searched via genealogyindexer.org.
 Portugal: In Portugal, the Páginas Amarelas are controlled by Portugal Telecom and the website is pai.pt. The printed version is distributed for free to all land line users. There is also available a residential listing called Páginas Brancas.

Q 
 Qatar: In Qatar, the official Yellow Pages directory is called Qatar Yellow Pages and published by 'Primedia Qatar W.L.L'. The Qatar yellowpages features comprehensive business listings for industrial and commercial establishments across the region markets. This Directory is one of the most economical media for business to showcase their products and services. The user has a choice to reference print or source online or mobile wap.

R 
 Romania: In Romania, the directory is called 'Pagini Aurii' (Golden Pages) paginiaurii.ro.
 Russia: In Russia, KONTAKT EAST HOLDINGS (KEH.ST) established in 2006, is a Swedish holding company that owns Russian Company OOO Желтые страницы ("JOLTI STRANITSI") (Russian translation of Yellow Pages). OOO "JOLTI STRANITSI" is the result of the successful merger in 2007 of YPI YELLOW PAGES, established in 1993, a leading publisher of Yellow Pages directories in the St. Petersburg and Perm markets and Eniro RUS-M, a publisher of leading Yellow Pages directories in Moscow, Samara and 7 other Russian cities in the Urals and Volga region.

Other directories in Russia include:

Адрес Москва (Moscow address), by ZAO Verlag Euro Address;
Большая Телефонная Книга Москвы (Big Phone Book of Moscow), by Extra M Media;
Вся Деловая Москва (all business Moscow), by Biznes-Karta Business Information Agency;
Московский Бизнес - Moscow Business Telephone Guide by Московский Бизнес - Moscow Business Telephone Guide.

S 
 Saint Kitts and Nevis: In St Kitts & Nevis, the directory is published by Global Directories Limited and titled St Kitts and Nevis Yellow Pages. Print copies are distributed free to each telephone subscriber and is also available online at www.stkittsandnevisyp.com.
 Saint Lucia: In Saint Lucia, the directory is published by Global Directories Limited and titled St Lucia Yellow Pages. Print copies are distributed free to each telephone subscriber.
 Saint Vincent: In Saint Vincent and the Grenadines, the directory is published by Global Directories Limited and titled St Vincent Yellow Pages. Print copies are distributed free to each telephone subscriber and is also available online at www.stvincentyp.com.
 Saudi Arabia: In Saudi Arabia, the directory is Saudianyellowpages.com' 'Saudiarabyellowpages.com. Established in 2001, is the LARGEST yellow pages of Saudi Arabia. Yellow Pages Saudi Arabia.
 Saudi Arabia: Daleeli.com is an online business directory in Saudi Arabia to locate addresses, Phone numbers, maps, websites & locations of Business Places and offices in Saudi Arabia.
 Serbia: In Serbia, the directory is called 11811 which is a published by Telekom Srbija 11811.rs.
 Sierra Leone: In Sierra Leone, the online yellow pages directory, LeoneDirect powered by Denza, LLC. provides contact information for local companies.
 Singapore: In Singapore, it is known as "Yellow Pages" and is registered as a Public company under the name Yellow Pages (Singapore) Limited (Reg. no.:200304719G). It is listed on the Singapore SGX mainboard on 9 Dec 2004. It includes the Singapore Phone Book, the Chinese Yellow Pages and the Yellow Pages Buying and Commercial/Industrial Guides and advertisement sales. Yellow Pages Singapore also publishes and distributes niche directories and guides.
 Slovakia: In Slovakia, it is called "Zlaté stránky" (which means Golden Pages), published by Mediatel (a European Directories group company), Bratislava and is distributed free to each telephone subscriber, usually in exchange for its previous version. The online version is available at zlatestranky.sk.
 Slovenia: In Slovenia, the directory is called Rumene strani (Yellow Pages) which is a registered trademark belonging to Inter Marketing.
 South Africa: In South Africa, the directory is called 'the Yellow Pages' which is distributed by Trudon yellowpages.co.za, a subsidiary of World Directories which also publishes books in Belgium, Ireland, the Netherlands, Portugal and Romania. There are 19 regional editions covering the nine provinces. Each of the four metropolitan areas has a separate white and yellow pages book. The remaining 15 areas have both sections in one book. They also have a mobile version pocketbook.co.za. Another competitor is Yellosa.co.za is an online business directory in South Africa to locate addresses, phone numbers, maps, websites, photos of business places and offices in South Africa.
 Spain: In Spain, it is called Páginas Amarillas, it was distributed by Telefónica Publicidad e Información S.A. Yellowpages – now known as Yell Publicidad – can also be found via the Internet Address www.paginasamarillas.es. Since July 2006 the company is owned by Hibu from the UK. A competitor is www.qdq.com, a directory edited by Pages Jaunes Group from France. Another competitor is citiservi, a different yellow pages service where Professionals search for Customers requesting services. Also there is an English-speaking expat directory of businesses along the south east of Spain called www.littleyellowpages.com. This site is aimed mainly at English speaking expatriates living in Spain.
 Sri Lanka: In Sri Lanka, the official 'Yellow Pages' publisher is produced by Sri Lanka Telecom. However, competing publishers also use the term 'Rainbow Pages' though not the walking fingers logo.
 Sweden: In Sweden, it is called Gula Sidorna, distributed by Eniro. yellowpages.se is a portal to different Yellowpages from Sweden. Gulex.se is an alternative Swedish directory, distributed by the Norwegian company Advista. Lokaldelen i Sverige AB (a European Directories group company) provide over 250 local directories in Sweden. Also hitta.se, an Online business directory by Norwegian company Schibsted.
 Switzerland: In Switzerland the brand local.ch produces and distributes directories in several forms (printed, online and on mobile) including yellow and white pages – online available in German, French, Italian and English.
 Syria: In Syria, the directory is called الصفحات الصفراء (Yellow Pages).

 T 
 Thailand: In Thailand it is called Samood Nar Leung and also called Thailand YellowPages. The company Teleinfo Media Public Company Limited produce and distribute Yellow pages nationwide. Thailand YellowPages is generated in several forms e.g. paper, Call Center no. 1188. Thailand YellowPages is produced both in Thai and English.
 Tunisia: In Tunisia, it is called "الصفحات الصفراء" (Pages Jaunes) and it is owned by "Les Editions Techniques Spécialisées", a Tunisian private company. The online version, available at pagesjaunes.com.tn for free was one of the first online directories in Arabic.
 Turkey: In Turkey, it is called "Yellow Pages" which is distributed by Dataworks Digital Marketing and Data Services Company, located in Kağıthane – Istanbul. Since 2006 Yellow Pages is building and managing Database of Commercial Entities in Turkey. Yellow Pages is serving to SMEs and Enterprise Companies as digital partner for Location Based Indexing, Verified Business Listing Reference for Market, building Websites to help digitalization of zero digital Companies and Digital Ad campaign partner. Yellow Pages database is being used in Google Maps, Apple Maps, Yandex Maps, Huawei Petal Search & Maps as reference too.
 Turkish Republic of Northern Cyprus In [Turkish Republic of Northern Cyprus]. Known as CYPYP it is found at cypyp.com
 Turks and Caicos Islands: In the Turks and Caicos Islands there are two telephone directories. One is published by Olympia Publishing Company, a Turks & Caicos Islands company, and carries listings from the two major telecommunications companies on the Island and the other is published by a subsidiary of Global Directories Limited, a Caymanian-based company, which carries the listings from one of the two major telecommunications companies on the Islands. Both publications are titled the Turks and Caicos Islands Yellow Pages and refer to themselves as "Local" but the Olympia Publishing Company directory is the larger and more definitive and it is the only local directory publisher.

 U 
 Ukraine: In Ukraine, the free business directory is titled PromUA, it is available online at prom.ua. Other directories are: ukrindustrial.com, ukrbiznes.com, ukrpartner.com.
 United Arab Emirates: yellowpages-uae.com is one of the best online search directory in UAE for finding local businesses across Dubai, Al Ain, Sharjah, Ajman, Umm Al Quwain, Ras Al Khaimah and Abu Dhabi.
 United Arab Emirates: Dubai-based Local Search UAE is an Online Business Directory UAE where all businesses across Abu Dhabi, Al Ain, Dubai, Fujairah, Sharjah, Ras Al Khaimah & Umm Al Quwain are listed and can be searched.
 United Arab Emirates: Dubai-based Express Print (Publishers) L.L.C. is the official publisher of Etisalat Yellow Pages branded products in the UAE. Express Print (Publishers) L.L.C. publishes the Yellow Pages in both print and electronic formats. Etisalat Yellow Pages print edition consists of 3 regional directories for the areas of Abu Dhabi, Dubai and the Northern Emirates. Directories are published annually and distributed towards the end of the first quarter of each year. Express Print (Publishers) L.L.C. also publishes the Etisalat Yellow Pages on 2 electronic platforms -Online & Mobile.
 United Arab Emirates: As of late 2016, Dubai-based ZOSER MEA is the official publisher of du Yellow Pages branded products in the UAE. ZOSER MEA publishes the Yellow Pages in both print and electronic formats. Directories are published annually and distributed in the month of January each year.
 United Arab Emirates: In United Arab Emirates, the directory is titled Yellow Page Gulf UAE. Established in January 2011, is the LARGEST yellow pages of GULF. Yellow Pages Gulf.
 United Kingdom: The first Yellow Pages directory in the UK was produced by the Hull Corporation's telephone department (now KCOM Group) in 1954. This was distributed with the alphabetical phone directory rather than as a stand-alone publication. The company now produces The Hull Colour Pages.

With the encouragement of Thomson Corporation, at the time an advertising sales agent for the nationalised General  Post Office's telephone directory, a business telephone number directory named the Yellow Pages was first produced in 1966 by the GPO for the Brighton area, and was rolled out nationwide in 1973. The Thomson Corporation formed Thomson Yellow Pages in 1966 to publish and to distribute the directory to telephone subscribers for the GPO, and later for The Post Office.

Thomson Yellow Pages was sold by The Thomson Corporation in 1980, at the same time as Post Office Telecommunications became the (then) state-owned British Telecom (BT). The Yellow Pages directory continued to be distributed to all telephone subscribers by BT. At the same time, The Thomson Corporation formed Thomson Directories Ltd, and began to publish the Thomson Local directory, which would remain the Yellow Pages' main, and often sole, competitor in the UK for more than the next two decades, and would be the competitive driving force behind such changes to Yellow Pages as the adoption (in 1999) of colour printing and "white knock out" listings.

In 1984 the year that BT was privatised, the department producing the directory became a stand alone subsidiary of BT, named Yellow Pages. In the mid-1990s the Yellow Pages business was re-branded as Yell, although the directory itself continued to be known as the Yellow Pages.

Yell was bought by venture capitalists in 2001, and in 2003 was floated on the Stock Exchange. After the one year "no competition" clause expired BT too went into competition with the Yellow Pages, re-entering the market by adding similar content to their existing directory, "The Phone Book", adding a classified section to the traditional alphabetical domestic and business listings.

Yellow Pages, Thomson Local and BT's The Phone Book display advertising and can be booked directly with advertising sales representatives.

Nowadays the KC Yellow Pages is referred to as Hull Colour Pages, and is separate from the White Pages. Yell now also publishes an East Yorkshire edition of Yellow Pages in competition.

 United States: In the past, AT&T, Verizon, and Qwest, the three largest phone companies in the U.S., dominated the U.S. yellow pages industry; however, the term "yellow pages" and the Walking Fingers logo was heavily marketed by AT&T pre divestiture. However, AT&T never filed a trademark registration application for the current and most recognized version of the Walking Fingers logo, so it is in the public domain. AT&T allowed the "independent yellow pages" industry to use the logo freely. The "independents" are unrelated to the incumbent phone company and are either pure advertising operations with no phone infrastructure or telephone companies who provide local telephone service elsewhere. Such independents include operators who typically focus on industry or business segments, or local market directories.

Yellow pages publishers or their agents sell the right to place advertisements within the same category, next to the basic listings.

For example, AT&T is the dominant local telephone service provider in California, but since Bell Atlantic and GTE merged to become Verizon, it now provides service in many pockets such as West Los Angeles. Los Angeles telephone users can select from telephone directories published by AT&T, Verizon (published by Idearc), Yellow Book USA, PDC Pages (Phone Directories Company) PDC Pages.com and other independent publishing companies. R. H. Donnelley is also in local markets across country with Dex Printed Directories and DexKnows.com. In Northern California, Valley Yellow Pages MyYP.com is a large regional independent publisher. Additionally, in the smaller markets, many yellow pages publishers are beginning to offer directories catering to specific niche business or industry segments, such as automotive, manufacturing, environmental/green products, imports, exports, and the like. One such example is the Export Yellow Pages (a yellow page directory published in partnership with the US Department of Commerce that focuses on U.S. exporters) and vertical directories offered by Yellow Pages Nationwide, Inc. Media an Online Digital Yellow Pages company, Consolidation and M&A activity in the directory publishing market continues to remain very high in the U.S. and there is an increasing move toward internet based directories as internet usage for search increases and concerns over the possible negative environmental effects of the books becomes more evident.
 Yellowpages.com is a subsidiary of Dex Media.
 Uruguay: In Uruguay, the directory was called Páginas Amarillas and was printed from 1983 by Volt Directories S.A. In 2015 Volt Directories was acquired by FCR Media Group and in the following year closed its printing facilities in Uruguay. The directory is still available online as paginasamarillas.com.uy.
 Uzbekistan: In Uzbekistan, the directory is called Yellow Pages of Uzbekistan, published by Yellow Pages Ltd.

 V 
 Vietnam: In Vietnam, the official title "Vietnam Business Directory - Vietnam Yellow Pages in English and ''Trang Vang Viet Nam "in Vietnamese are produced and distributed nationwide by Vietnam Enterprise Information & Technology., JSC.

References

See also 
 Telecommunications service
 Yellow pages